The Djupfjordstraumen Bridge (also known as Djupfjordbrua) is a cantilever road bridge that crosses the Djupfjorden in Sortland Municipality in Nordland county, Norway. The bridge was opened in 1983. It is located on the west coast of the island of Hinnøya.

See also
List of bridges in Norway
List of bridges in Norway by length
List of bridges
List of bridges by length

References

Sortland
Road bridges in Nordland
Bridges completed in 1983
1983 establishments in Norway
Roads within the Arctic Circle